Local elections were held in Zamboanga City on May 13, 2019, within the Philippine general election. The voters elected for the elective local posts in the city: the mayor, vice mayor, and eight councilors per district.

Retiring and term-limited elective officials
 Cesar Iturralde, incumbent Vice-Mayor, term-limited in 2019
 Rodolfo Bayot, incumbent District I councilor, term-limited in 2019
 Rommel Agan, incumbent District II councilor, term-limited in 2019

Candidates
Notes:
 bold means the candidate is incumbent and running for reelection on the same post;
 italic means the candidate previously run last 2016 election either on the same post or other posts;
 bold and italic means the candidate is an incumbent and is running for another position.

Notes
 Adelante Zamboanga Party

 Dela Cruz is also a guest candidate of Team Climaco Coalition.

 Partido Prosperidad y Amor para na Zamboanga

 Aggrupation of Parties for Progress

Results

The candidates for district representative, mayor, and vice mayor, with the highest number of votes, wins the seat; they are voted separately, therefore they may be of different parties when elected.

House of Representatives election

1st District
Incumbent Congressman Celso Lobregat ran for Mayor against former ally, Beng Climaco.

2nd District
District II Representative Manuel Jose Dalipe ran for reelection against former Congresswoman Lilia Macrohon-Nuño, former Congressman Erbie Fabian, and outgoing Vice-Mayor Cesar Iturralde.

Mayoral elections
Incumbent Mayor Beng Climaco ran for reelection for her third and final term.

Vice-mayoral elections
Incumbent and outgoing Vice-Mayor Cesar Iturralde ran for the congressional seat in District II. All candidates for vice-mayor were either incumbent or former city councilors.

City Council elections
Each of Zamboanga City's two legislative districts elects eight councilors to the City Council. The eight candidates with the highest number of votes wins the seats per district.

1st District

|-bgcolor=black
|colspan=6|

2nd District

|-bgcolor=black
|colspan=6|

See also
Philippine House of Representatives elections in the Zamboanga Peninsula, 2019
2019 Philippine general election
2022 Zamboanga City local elections

References

External links
Official website of the Commission on Elections
 Official website of National Movement for Free Elections (NAMFREL)
Official website of the Parish Pastoral Council for Responsible Voting (PPCRV)
Rappler #PHVOTE 2019: Local Races

2019 Philippine local elections
Elections in Zamboanga City
May 2019 events in the Philippines